The Benelli MR1 is a semi-automatic rifle developed and manufactured by Benelli Armi SpA of Italy.

Details

The action is a gas-operated, rotating bolt, using the ARGO system patented by Benelli. The rifle is the little brother of the Benelli Argo full size hunting rifle. This weapon operates only in semi-automatic mode, and no selective-fire or otherwise full-automatic version of the MR1 carbine is planned. Beretta is already developing a completely different new-generation rifle called the ARX-160 for military and law enforcement use. The MR1 is thus not in any military use, as it has not been intended to be, albeit one of its variants has also been intended as a "home defence carbine".

Manufacture

The MR1 is the first .223 caliber carbine in the Benelli-family. It is entirely and solely manufactured in the Benelli Armi
plant in Urbino, and marked "Beretta Holding" as owned by Beretta since 1983; nonetheless, in Italy, the MR1 carbine is inscribed on the National Catalogue of Firearms (the list of firearms approved for civilian ownership by the Italian Ministry of Interior) as the Benelli Mr1. The samples sold in the United States are assembled at the Beretta-USA plant in Accokeek, Maryland with imported parts of Italian manufacture.

Variants
As of 2007, the weapon is available in a wide array of variants; available barrel lengths are 12.5”, 16" and 20" inches, with two different stocks available: standard hunting rifle stock, sporting stock with fixed buttstock and pistol grip.  The 12.5 inch barrel is threaded and features a removable muzzle brake.  The MR1 has a MIL-STD-1913 “Picatinny” top rail, with side and bottom and fore-end rails optional.

The gas port is located just forward of the chamber where the gases are hotter and cleaner.

The MR1 Storm has nine attachment points for slings to accommodate multiple carry options.  It does not require tools for disassembly.  When the last round fires, the bolt locks to the rear. A ghost ring sight, adjustable for windage and elevation, is standard.

Availability

The market availability of the different models of the MR1 carbine differ from country to country.  The 12.5 inch variant with removable muzzle brake, which has been primarily intended as a home defence carbine, is normally on sale in Italy like all the other variants, while in the United States it is not yet available (December 2007) in any model to civilians.  The 12.5 inch model may be sold by Beretta-USA only as a "SBR", and all NFA rules apply to it, as its short barrel length restricts its civilian availability as a "Short Barreled Rifle" (any rifle with a barrel length less than 16 inches as described in the NFA Title 2), a category of firearms which is forbidden to own in certain States and that requires a BATFE Form 4 to be filed and a payment of $200.00. The strict regulations of the National Firearms Act are compounded by the Gun Control Act of 1968, which prohibits the importation of such firearms, on the auspicies that they are not particularly suitable for or readily adaptable to sporting purposes.

5.56×45mm NATO semi-automatic rifles
MR1
Carbines